The Kanci–Pejagan Toll Road is a toll road in Indonesia connecting the village of Kanci in Cirebon Regency, West Java and the village of Pejagan in Brebes Regency, Central Java. It is part of the Trans-Java Toll Road and Indonesian National Route 1, and also a part of Asian Highway 2.

History
The toll road was opened on 26 January 2010. The toll road was previously operated by Bakrie Toll Road. The length of this toll road is about 36 kilometres. In 2013, the toll is acquired by MNC Land and now operated by Waskita Toll Road.

Exits

Note: The number on the exits is based on the distance from the western terminus of the Jakarta-Cikampek Toll Road, while the distance numbers are based on the distance from the western terminus of this toll road only

References

Toll roads in Java
Transport in West Java
Cirebon
Cirebon Regency
Transport in Central Java